James Steven Cook (born 2 August 1979) is an English footballer who plays for Oxford City.

Career
Cook started his career with his hometown club Oxford United, where he played 77 times in the Football League, scoring seven goals. He then joined Boston United in February 2000, where he was a part of the team that beat Dagenham & Redbridge to the Conference title that season. The midfielder then had a spell with Conference side Stevenage Borough in 2002 before joining Bath City on loan.

In 2005–06 he revived his football career with Hellenic League outfit Witney United scoring more than 30 goals before making a move to Rushden & Diamonds in January 2007, where he stayed for three months making 7 Conference appearances, scoring a single goal.

Cook rejoined former Boston United manager Steve Evans at Crawley Town at the start of the 2007–08 season. On 19 January 2008, Cook scored a hat-trick in the 4–1 win over his former club Rushden & Diamonds.

He went back to Oxford United for £5000 in a transfer funded by Oxford United fans, with Crawley desperate to reduce their wage bill due to financial difficulties, on 1 September 2009. After scoring only three goals in 16 appearances, he left the club by mutual consent on 28 June 2010. Although he was a target for Rushden & Diamonds, he rejoined Crawley Town a day after leaving Oxford. On 31 May 2011, he signed for Bath City.

Jamie is also the subject of the song "Jamie Cook" by the singer/songwriter Gavin Osborn which features on the album In The Twee Small Hours.

Career statistics

References

External links

1979 births
Living people
Footballers from Oxford
English footballers
Association football midfielders
Oxford United F.C. players
Boston United F.C. players
Stevenage F.C. players
Bath City F.C. players
Witney Town F.C. players
Rushden & Diamonds F.C. players
Crawley Town F.C. players
Oxford City F.C. players
North Leigh F.C. players
English Football League players
National League (English football) players